Opua nethodes is a species of ray-finned fish from the family Gobiidae which is native to the Marshall Islands and Hawaii.

References

Gobiidae
Fish described in 1925